Desert mallow is a common name for several plants and may refer to:

Sphaeralcea ambigua
Sphaeralcea incana